Gettle is a surname of German origin. Notable people with the surname include:

Lewis E. Gettle (1863–1930), American educator, lawyer, and politician
William Gettle (c. 1887–1941), American businessman

See also
Gettel

References

Surnames of German origin